Upper Cape Cod Regional Technical School (also known as Upper Cape Tech, UCT, or simply Upper Cape) is a public vocational-technical high school located in Bourne, Massachusetts, United States. Opened in 1966, it serves over 720 students in 15 vocational areas of study. The school is approved by the Massachusetts Department of Education to offer Chapter 74 technical programs.

As a regional school, Upper Cape Cod Tech functions as its own district and serves students from five nearby communities, all of which are located in the Upper Cape region of Cape Cod. Upper Cape Tech serves students from the towns of Bourne, Falmouth, Sandwich, Wareham, and Marion.

The school's mascot is the Rams, and the school's colors are Royal Blue and White.

Upper Cape Tech also hosts Doran Park, home field of the Cape Cod Baseball League's Bourne Braves.

Demographics

Technical programs
Upper Cape Tech currently offers 15 vocational and technical shop programs to students. The offered shops are listed below:

Automotive Collision Repair
Automotive Technology
Carpentry
Cosmetology 
Culinary Arts 
Electrical 
Engineering Technology 
Environmental Science & Technology 
Health Technology
Heating, Ventilation & Air Conditioning 
Horticulture & Landscape Contracting
Information Technology 
Marine Technology
Plumbing & Heating
Veterinary Science

Athletics
Upper Cape fielded its first football team after the co-op with Bourne High School was disbanded in 2010. They went 44 under a JV schedule and played their first varsity game on November 22, 2010 against Cape Cod Regional Technical High School. Upper Cape fielded a varsity team in 2011 and joined the Mayflower League. In Upper Cape Tech's first varsity season, the team finished with a 28 record. Upper Cape also fielded a JV and Freshman football team that fall.

In 2012, in just the football team's second varsity season, the Rams finished the regular season with a 91 record and won the Mayflower Small League Championship. They clinched a berth in the Massachusetts Division 5 State Championship game against Dorchester, who came into the game undefeated at 100. Led by their All-State running back Jon Dumont, the Rams beat Dorchester by a score of 228, winning their first state championship in football. The win was also Upper Cape's first state championship in any sport in the school's history. The Rams finished the season with a 101 record and were ranked 25th in the state.

The football team has continued to assert itself as a strong small school program, qualifying for the playoffs again in 2013.

In 2016, the football team won their first Vocational Small State Championship by defeating Blue Hills by a score of 2214.

Upper Cape Tech offers numerous sports for students. Listed below are the sports that Upper Cape offers to students.

Sports:

Fall
Football
Boys' Soccer
Girls' Soccer
Volleyball
Cross-Country
Golf
Cheerleading
Winter
Boys' Basketball
Girls' Basketball
Ice Hockey
Cheerleading
Spring
Baseball
Softball
Lacrosse

References

External links
Upper Cape Tech website
Massachusetts Department of Education: directory Information.

Schools in Barnstable County, Massachusetts
Bourne, Massachusetts
Public high schools in Massachusetts
Educational institutions accredited by the Council on Occupational Education
1966 establishments in Massachusetts
Educational institutions established in 1966